Kevin Ian Simm (born 5 September 1980) is an English pop singer. He won The Voice UK on 9 April 2016. Simm was in the group Liberty X from 2001 until their split in 2007, and is currently the lead singer of the group Wet Wet Wet.

Early life
Simm was born on 5 September 1980 in Chorley, Lancashire, England. He attended St Anne's Primary School then St. Mary's Catholic Technology College in Leyland between 1991 and 1996, where he showed promise as a junior footballer. In his last year in secondary school, he performed Elton John's "Daniel" in the school's annual show. Simm decided to concentrate on music and joined a local indie band called AnAlien where he began writing his own material. He applied to go on the ITV talent show, Stars in Their Eyes, where he appeared as Simon Fowler of Ocean Colour Scene. After a few years of writing and performing on the northern pubs and clubs circuit, as well as spending a summer season in a band called Force 5 with James Fox, Simm auditioned for the ITV reality TV show, Popstars.

History

2001–07: Popstars and Liberty X
While the five winning contestants of Popstars formed Hear'Say, the five runner-up contestants formed the group Liberty. The name Liberty was chosen to reflect the freedom the members experienced following their participation in Popstars. Amidst pejorative media commentary (including the term "Flopstars"), the act proceeded to sign a multimillion-pound record contract with Richard Branson's independent record label V2 records. Shortly after forming, Liberty received a legal challenge in the UK High Court from a funk R&B band, also called "Liberty", who achieved success in the 1990s, including being awarded Capital Radio Band of the Year, playing Wembley Arena, European tours and the release of albums in the US, Europe and UK. The original Liberty claimed that the newly formed Liberty was taking advantage of the goodwill that had been created by the former's success (known in English law as the "tort of passing off"). The final judgment was in favour of the funk R&B band and the ex-Popstars then asked readers of UK tabloid newspaper, The Sun to suggest a new name. The winning name was "X Liberty", but the group used the entry as the basis for the official title, "Liberty X".

Liberty X enjoyed seven Top 10 singles from 2001 to 2005. Their biggest hit, "Just a Little", reached Number 1 in May
2002. "Thinking It Over", "Got to Have Your Love", "Being Nobody", "Song 4 Lovers" and "Holding on for You" all reached the top 5 in the UK Singles Chart. Their debut album, Thinking It Over, reached Number 3 in June 2002. Liberty X released another 2 albums, Being Somebody and X, which reached Numbers 12 and 27, respectively. Liberty X won the Brit Award for Best British Single. The group split in 2007 following disappointing album and singles sales from their third studio album.

In 2005, Simm appeared on The Games, winning a silver medal and featuring with convicted Who Wants to Be a Millionaire? cheat Charles Ingram, among other celebrities.

2007–15: Solo career and reformation of Liberty X
Simm, focusing on his solo career, created his own Myspace music profile, uploading demo tracks for his fans to hear his progress as a solo artist. In a March 2008 interview with Gordon McCully, he stated, "I've been very busy in the studio recording new solo tracks which I'll hopefully be able to share with people very soon." Simm was signed to JamDown Music, where his track "Brand New" is featured on their official website's music player. On 3 October 2008, Simm's debut album, titled Brand New, was released in Japan. The album has since appeared for purchase on iTunes.

In October 2012, it was confirmed that the group would reform for a one-off appearance at the Hammersmith Apollo and ITV2 series The Big Reunion which aired from 31 January 2013.

On 1 February 2014, Liberty X posted on their Facebook page that "We have an announcement coming tomorrow... ...but before that we've got some business at G-A-Y to attend to tonight, if you're coming we'll see you later!" The next day, following the performance at G-A-Y, they announced that they had signed to 365 Artists Management "for our future creative and business affairs." The group subsequently performed at a series of sporadic gigs during the spring and summer of 2014.

In 2015, during his audition for The Voice UK, Simm revealed that he left Liberty X as he felt the group were officially over.

2016: The Voice UK
In 2016, Simm auditioned for the fifth series of The Voice UK singing a soulful version of Sia's "Chandelier". All four coaches; will.i.am, Ricky Wilson, Boy George and Paloma Faith, turned their chairs for him and he chose to join Faith's team. Simm lost against Faith Nelson in the battle rounds and was nearly eliminated from the competition, but was stolen by Wilson, joining his team for the knockout rounds. He won the knockouts and won the final of The Voice UK on 9 April. Simm released his UK debut single "All You Good Friends" shortly afterwards.

Performances

On 28 May 2016 Simm rejoined Liberty X performing at Birmingham Gay Pride performing hits "Got to Have Your Love", "Holding on for You", "Being Nobody", Song 4 Lovers and "Just a Little" and the winner single "All You Good Friends".

2018–present
On 25 September 2018, it was announced that Simm would join Scottish band Wet Wet Wet as the new lead singer, replacing former member Marti Pellow. He started singing with the band at 2 shows, St Lukes in Calton, Glasgow and The Venue in London in November 2018. Following on from their sold-out shows, they then started a nationwide 18 date tour.

Personal life
Simm married his long-term girlfriend Laura in June 2008 in his hometown Chorley. They have two sons – Charles, born in April 2012, and Oliver, born in November 2013.

Discography

Albums

Singles

Filmography

References

External links
 Official website
 Kevin Simm – Brand New | Amazon Japan
 Kevin Simm – Brand New | HMV Japan
 JamDown Music
 Kevin Simm Interview

English male singers
English pop singers
English soul singers
English songwriters
Musicians from Lancashire
People from Chorley
1980 births
Living people
Liberty X
The Voice (franchise) winners
The Voice UK contestants
English Roman Catholics
Wet Wet Wet members